Pepe is a masculine given name and a surname.

Pepe or PEPE may also refer to:

People
Ka Pepe Diokno (senator, born 1922), real name Jose W. Diokno, Filipino nationalist
Pepe (footballer, born 1935), real name José Macia, Brazilian footballer
Pepe (footballer, born 1983), real name Képler Laveran Lima Ferreira, Brazilian-born Portuguese footballer
Pepe (footballer, born October 1983), real name Marcos Paulo Aguiar de Jesus, Brazilian footballer
Pepê (footballer, born 1997), real name Eduardo Gabriel Aquino Cossa, Brazilian footballer
Pepê (footballer, born 1998), real name João Pedro Vilardi Pinto, Brazilian footballer

Entertainment
 Pepe (film), a 1960 film directed by George Sidney
 "Pepe" (song), featured in the 1960 film

Other uses
 Pepe (textiles), secondhand clothes popular in Haiti
 Pepe Jeans, a European denim and casual wear company
 Pepe's, a restaurant in New Haven, Connecticut, US
 Parallel Element Processing Ensemble, a computer system
 Pepe the Frog, a famous internet meme